Bonaire is an island in the Caribbean Sea, that forms part of the Netherlands.

Bonaire may also refer to:

 Bonaire, Georgia, an unincorporated town in the United States
 HNLMS Bonaire, a steamship of the Royal Netherlands Navy

See also
 Bon Air (disambiguation), the name of many different places in the United States
 Bonnaire, a surname